The Stone Flower Fountain stands in the so-called "Industrial Square" of the Exhibition of Economic Achievements (VDNH) in Moscow, Russia. It was named and designed after the eponymous flower from Pavel Bazhov's fairy-tale "The Stone Flower".

The Stone Flower Fountain was built in 1954. The fountain was decorated with figures of birds, fruit and ears. Some sculpted details fountain created were carved by the sculptors  and V. V. Aleksandrova-Roslavleva, and the mosaics works were done in the workshop of the Soviet Academy of Arts. It was the first light and musical fountain in the USSR. The music for it was created by Dmitri Shostakovich.

See also

References

External links
  The Stone Flower Fountain at the VDNH official website

Fountains in Russia
1954 sculptures
Exhibition of Achievements of National Economy
Cultural heritage monuments of federal significance in Moscow